Centaurea depressa, the low cornflower, is a species of Centaurea.  It is native to southwestern and central Asia. Its common name is Iranian knapweed. The plant grows to 0.3 m (1 ft) tall and flowers from July to August.  It can grow in nutritionally poor soil and is drought tolerant.

Description

Centaurea depressa is an annual plant that grows from 20 to 60 cm tall. Several stems grow from the base of the plant. They are openly branched and have a gray color with short hairs. The leaves are oblong blades that grow 5–10 cm long and have fine hairs on them. The florets are a dark blue.

References

depressa